The 2021 Yas Island Formula 2 round was the eighth and final race of the 2021 FIA Formula 2 Championship. It took place at the Yas Marina Circuit from 10 to 12 December in support of the 2021 Abu Dhabi Grand Prix and featured three races.

Oscar Piastri clinched the driver's title after finishing third in Sprint Race 1; in doing so, the Australian driver is the third rookie after Charles Leclerc and George Russell to win the championship in the modern Formula 2 era.

Classification

Qualifying

Sprint race 1

Sprint Race 2

Feature race

Final championship standings 

Drivers' Championship standings

Teams' Championship standings

 Note: Only the top five positions are included for both sets of standings.
 Note: Bold names include the Drivers' and Teams' Champion respectively.

See also 
2021 Abu Dhabi Grand Prix

References

External links 

Yas Island
Yas Island Formula 2
Yas Island Formula 2